Gymkhana Ground may refer to:

 Central Gymkhana Ground, Indore
 Bombay Gymkhana, a venue for multiple sports including cricket and football
 Gymkhana Ground, a now defunct cricket venue in Rangoon, Burma (today Yangon, Myanmar)
 Gymkhana Ground, Secunderabad, a cricket ground in the Secunderabad, Telangana, established in 1928
 Gymkhana Club Ground, Nairobi
 Poona Gymkhana Ground, Pune
 Deccan Gymkhana Ground, Pune
 Coast Gymkhana Club Ground, Mombasa
 Karachi Gymkhana, Karachi
 Gymkhana Ground, Bengaluru
 PJ Hindu Gymkhana Ground, Mumbai
 Parsi Gymkhana Ground

See also

 Gymkhana, a typical Anglo-Indian expression, which is derived from the Hindi-Urdu word Jamat-khana, is an Indian term which referred to a place of assembly